The Fifth Thai–Lao Friendship Bridge is a proposed highway bridge over the Mekong River that links the Bueng Kan Province of Thailand and Pakxan town, Bolikhamxai Province in Laos. The project includes a 10 miles four-lane road, namely a 7.5 miles  Highway 244 at Bueng Kan district, the 0.81 miles Mekong Bridge Proper (two-lane) and a 1.7 miles road in Laos.

Construction began in December 2021 and is expected to take three years.

See also
 First Thai–Lao Friendship Bridge
 Second Thai–Lao Friendship Bridge
 Third Thai–Lao Friendship Bridge
 Fourth Thai–Lao Friendship Bridge
 Sixth Thai–Lao Friendship Bridge
 Seventh Thai–Lao Friendship Bridge

References

External links

Thai–Lao Friendship Bridge 05
Thai–Lao Friendship Bridge 05
Thai–Lao Friendship Bridge 05
Thai–Lao Friendship Bridge 05
Thai–Lao Friendship Bridge 05
Thai–Lao Friendship Bridge 05